Egypt–European Union relations are the foreign relations between the country of Egypt and the European Union.

Under the aegis of the Global Mediterranean Policy (GMP) launched in 1972, an agreement between the European Economic Community and Egypt was signed in January 1977. The framework laid out by the 1995 Euro-Mediterranean Partnership paved the way for some modest advances in the EU–Egypt relations, leading to a new association agreement signed on 25 June 2001 in the context of the Barcelona process, that entered into force in June 2004. An EU–Egypt Action Plan also entered into force in 2007.

The outbreak of the Arab Spring defied the traditional stability-driven policy conducted by the EU in the region, conveyed by the support to authoritarian rulers in office, including Egypt's Hosni Mubarak, eventually leading to a reassessment of the EU foreign policy in the region.

Both sides share a common membership in the Union for the Mediterranean.

Chronology of relations with the EU

See also 
 Foreign relations of Egypt
 Foreign relations of the European Union

References 
Citations

Bibliography
 
 
 

 
EU
Third-country relations of the European Union